Sauca may refer to:

Saúca, a municipality in Guadalajara, Spain
Sauca, a commune in Ocnița district, Moldova
Sauca, a village in Laza Commune, Vaslui County, Romania
Săuca, a commune in Satu Mare County, Romania